Rajahmundry railway station (station code:RJY) located in the Indian state of Andhra Pradesh, serves Rajahmundry in East Godavari district. It is administered under Vijayawada railway division of South Coast Railway zone (formerly South Central Railway zone). Rajahmundry railway station has computerised reservation facilities (with all-India linkage)

History 
The Godavari Dam Construction Railway was used for transporting materials for the construction of the Dowlaisweram Anicut at Rajahmundry around 1845. The project was completed in 1852 and the railway was closed down.

Between 1893 and 1896,  of the East Coast State Railway, between Vijayawada and Cuttack was opened for traffic. The construction of the Old Godavari Bridge in 1897 and construction of the Vijayawada–Madras link in 1899 enabled the through running of trains. The southern part of the East Coast State Railway (from Waltair to Vijayawada) was taken over by Madras Railway in 1901.

Classification 
In terms of earnings and outward passengers handled, Rajahmundry is categorized as a Non-Suburban Grade-3 (NSG-3) railway station. Based on the re–categorization of Indian Railway stations for the period of 2017–18 and 2022–23, an NSG–3 category station earns between – crore and handles  passengers.

Structure and amenities 
In 2013,  was spent on improving the amenities at the station. It is one of the 38 stations in the division to be equipped with Automatic Ticket Vending Machines (ATVMs).  The station has roof top solar panels installed by the Indian railways, along with various railway stations and service buildings in the country, as a part of sourcing 500 MW solar energy. Elevators at platform 1&3. Escalators on 1&3: prepaid AC waiting hall & VIP lounge on platform #1.

See also 
 List of railway stations in India

References

External links 

 Trains at Rajahmundry

Railway stations in East Godavari district
Vijayawada railway division
Buildings and structures in Rajahmundry
Transport in Rajahmundry